Sacoglottis is a genus of plant in family Humiriaceae. It includes several species of trees, native to tropical South America and West Africa.

Species
(this list may be incomplete)
 Sacoglottis amazonica Mart.
 Sacoglottis cydonioides Cuatrec.
 Sacoglottis gabonensis (Baill.) Urb.
 Sacoglottis guianensis Benth.
 Sacoglottis holridgei Cuatrec.
 Sacoglottis mattogrossensis Malme
 Sacoglottis ovicarpa Cuatrec.
 Sacoglottis trichogyna Cuatrec.

References

External links

Humiriaceae
Malpighiales genera